"Frohes Fest" ("Merry Christmas") is a song by the German hip hop group Die Fantastischen Vier, released in 1992. From 1993 to 2018, the song was 'indexed' (banned) in Germany by the Federal Department for Media Harmful to Young Persons.

Track list 
 Frohes Fest (6:05) 
 Eins und eins (1:54)
 Frohes Fest (instrumental) (4:42)

Charts

Sources 
 
 

1992 singles
Die Fantastischen Vier songs
Christmas songs
1992 songs
Columbia Records singles
Songs written by Thomas D
German-language songs